The San Jose Stealth are a lacrosse team based in San Jose playing in the National Lacrosse League (NLL). The 2006 season was the 7th in franchise history and 3rd as the Stealth (previously the Albany Attack).

The 2006 Stealth looked to rebound from the dismal 4-12 2005 season. But after starting the season 5-4, they lost their last seven games to finish 5-11.

Regular season

Conference standings

Game log
Reference:

Player stats
Reference:

Runners (Top 10)

Note: GP = Games played; G = Goals; A = Assists; Pts = Points; LB = Loose Balls; PIM = Penalty minutes

Goaltenders
Note: GP = Games played; MIN = Minutes; W = Wins; L = Losses; GA = Goals against; Sv% = Save percentage; GAA = Goals against average

Awards

Transactions

Trades

Roster
Reference:

See also
2006 NLL season

References

San Jose
2006 in sports in California